William Charles Clymo (30 October 1884 – 8 October 1955) was the captain of the Ballarat Fire Brigade for almost forty years, and was also an excellent sportsman, being an Australian rules footballer who played for St Kilda. He later coached Geelong to a premiership in the Victorian Football League (VFL).

Career
He made his St Kilda debut in 1907 and, in that season, was a member of the first St Kilda side to compete in the finals.

After three years playing in the VFL, Clymo was appointed captain of the Ballarat Fire Brigade. Re-locating to Ballarat, he became captain-coach of the local Golden Point club in the Ballarat Football League, and led the club to premierships in 1910, 1914 and 1919.

He also coached Ballarat from 1920, including a premiership in 1923. In 1924, he was successful in taking Moolort to its only flag in the Maryborough competition. He later took up umpiring.

In 1929, Clymo took charge of the Ballarat Imperial Football Club, which won the premiership that year and was runner-up in 1930.

In 1931, he was appointed coach of Geelong and helped them to a VFL premiership. To fulfil his appointment, Clymo got six months leave of absence from his employer, the Ballarat brickmakers, Selkirks. Geelong defeated Richmond in the Grand Final by 20 points. 

In 1932, Clymo was back coaching Golden Point. It was the depths of the Great Depression, and he coached without compensation because the club had little money.

He served as captain of the Ballarat Fire Brigade from 1910 to his retirement in 1949. He was a keen participant in the Fire Brigade competitions, winning over 150 trophies between 1907 and 1925.

Clymo died in 1955, leaving a widow and a son.

References

External links

https://afltables.com/afl/stats/coaches/Charlie_Clymo.html

1884 births
1955 deaths
St Kilda Football Club players
Geelong Football Club coaches
Geelong Football Club Premiership coaches
Eaglehawk Football Club players
Ballarat Football Club players
Golden Point Football Club players
Golden Point Football Club coaches
Australian rules footballers from Bendigo
One-time VFL/AFL Premiership coaches